The Kappeyne van de Coppello cabinet was the cabinet of the Netherlands from 3 November 1877 until 20 August 1879. The cabinet was formed by Independent Liberals after the election of 1877. The centre-right cabinet was a minority government in the House of Representatives. Independent Classical Liberal Jan Kappeyne van de Coppello was Prime Minister.

Cabinet Members

 Served ad interim.
 Died in office.

References

External links
Official

  Kabinet-Kappeyne van de Coppello Parlement & Politiek

Cabinets of the Netherlands
1877 establishments in the Netherlands
1879 disestablishments in the Netherlands
Cabinets established in 1877
Cabinets disestablished in 1879
Minority governments